Milax caucasicus is a species of air-breathing land slug, a terrestrial pulmonate gastropod mollusk in the family Milacidae.

Distribution 
The species occurs in Caucasus: Georgia.

Type locality is Borjomi in Georgia.

Ecology 
There is no information about its habitat and ecology.

References

Milacidae
Gastropods described in 1912